Darmont was a French automobile manufacturer, based at Courbevoie in the Paris conurbation, and active between 1919 and 1939.

The business
During the First World War, Robert Darmont started his business as an importer of Morgan three-wheelers from England.   When peace broke out he set up an auto-making business in partnership with his brother André, operating from a workshop at Courbevoie in the western part of Paris. In 1921, the brothers obtained a licence to build Morgan three-wheelers in France,  and a faithful replica, the Darmont-Morgan, was the result.

The manufacturer remained faithful to their three-wheeler formula until 1935 when they launched the V-Junior.  With the outbreak of the Second World War Darmont was obliged to declare itself bankrupt.

Cars

Darmont-Morgan 

The Darmont-Morgan is virtually indistinguishable from the Morgan three-wheeler on which it was based. At the front, was an air-cooled V-2 cylinder 4-stroke motor tilted forward and with a capacity of 1084 cc, which was enough to power the vehicle to a top speed of about 125 km/h (78 mph). By the time of the October 1928 Paris Motor Show, the manufacturer was displaying a range of Morgan-based three wheelers, with a range of performance, levels, but most of them still with the 1084 cc engine of which both air-cooled and water-cooled variants were offered.

The little cars had a successful career in street races and mountain races such as the Mont Ventoux Rally. In 1921, Darmonts took the first three places in a road race from Paris to Nice.

Darmont Spécial 

The Darmont Spécial was produced from 1926, fitted with a water-cooled version of the V-2 cylinder engine and a claimed top speed of 150 km/h (93 mph). During the 1930s various more luxuriously fitted out variants of the (originally rather stripped-down) Spécial appeared.

The Darmont Étoile de France produced from 1932 closely resembled the Darmont Spécial.

Darmont V Junior 

The Darmont V Junior appeared in Autumn 1935. It was the first (and only) Darmont to come with four wheels. Reassuringly, however, the V-2 cylinder engine of approximately 1100 cc will have been familiar to those who knew the manufacturer's three-wheelers.  It also remained faithful to some antiquated characteristics such as a hand-operated throttle mounted on the steering wheel, which closely connected the car to the by then unpopular cyclecars.

References

External links 

 GTÜ Gesellschaft für Technische Überwachung mbH  (Access date 24 March 2013)
 www.morgan3w.de (German.  Access date 8 September 2012)
 Histomobile.com (French.  Access date September 2012)

Defunct motor vehicle manufacturers of France